Atwima Nwabiagya District is one of the 30 political and administrative districts in Ashanti Region, Ghana. It is situated in the western part of the region and shares common boundaries with Ahafo Ano South and Atwima Mponua Districts to the West, Offinso Municipal to the North, Amansie–West and Atwima Kwanwoma Districts to the South and Kumasi Metropolis and Afigya-Kwabre Districts to the East. It covers an estimated area of 294.84 sq. km. The district capital is Nkawie.

The district contains over twenty health care institutions owned privately and by the government.

See also
List of hospitals in the Ashanti Region
List of hospitals in Ghana

Atwima Nwabiagya
Hospitals in Atwima
Ashanti Region